Huntířov is a municipality and village in Děčín District in the Ústí nad Labem Region of the Czech Republic. It has about 800 inhabitants.

Administrative parts
Villages of Františkův Vrch, Nová Oleška and Stará Oleška are administrative parts of Huntířov.

References

Villages in Děčín District